Sherdley Park is a 336 acre (136 ha) urban park in Sutton, St Helens, Merseyside.

History

In the 19th century it was owned by coal and copper baron, Michael Hughes, who also built the now demolished Sherdley Hall. The estate was purchased by the local authority after the second world war as a place of relaxation for the citizens of Sutton. The park used to feature a pets corner but this has now closed.

Facilities
Sherdley Park is the largest park in the town. It includes an 18-hole golf course, a formal garden, open woodland, a lake and summer events. It is well known in the local area for hosting the St Helens Show which, in its heyday, was the largest free show in Europe. After many years of inactivity Sherdley Park began hosting the Sherdley Festival, a large annual three-day event of music from various genres.

References

External links
Sutton Beauty – A photographic appreciation of the Sutton district of St Helens including Sherdley Park
Visit St Helens - Sherdley Park - Tourist information regarding Sherdley Park

Parks and commons in St Helens, Merseyside